Hyperlais rivasalis is a species of moth in the family Crambidae. It is found in Spain.

The wingspan is 13–14 mm.

References

Moths described in 1905
Cybalomiinae